Federal College of Education , Yola is one of the post secondary institution in Adamawa State. It is located in Jimeta, Yola and the current provost is Dr. Mohammed Usman Degereji.

History 
Federal College of Education Yola (formerly known as Federal Advanced Teachers’ College FATC) was established as a teacher training institution in 1974 and it was not opened until 1975 with one hundred and fifty students.In 1984, it was renamed as Federal College of Education and in 1989, it became autonomous in line with the  Degree No, 4 of 1989 that founded  National Commission for Colleges of Education (NCCE) as a regulatory body for the colleges.

Schools and Departments 
The school operates the following schools:

School of Arts and Social Sciences

School of General Education

School of Language Programmes 

School of Adults Education

School of Early Childhood Care and Primary Education

School of Sciences and 

School of Vocational Studies

References 

Federal colleges of education in Nigeria
Education in Adamawa State
1974 establishments in Nigeria
Educational institutions established in 1974